The Blood of His Fathers is a 1917 American silent drama film directed by Harrish Ingraham and starring Crane Wilbur, Jode Mullally and Ruth King. The film begins shortly after the American Civil War when a renegade Confederate soldier commits three murders before jumping on to 1917.

Cast
 Crane Wilbur as Morgan Gray / Abel Gray
 Jode Mullally as Kane Gray
 Gene Crosby as Hope Halliday
 Don Bailey as William Halliday
 Jacob Abrams as Isaac in 1917
 Joseph Hazelton as Anderson
 Doc Crane as John Graham
 Ruth King as Amity Graham
 Richie Carpenter as Isaac in 1865
 Ray Thomson as Lieutenant Wilfred Torrance
 Julia Jackson as Mrs. Graham

References

Bibliography
 Connelly, Robert B. The Silents: Silent Feature Films, 1910-36, Volume 40, Issue 2. December Press, 1998.

External links
 

1917 films
1917 drama films
American silent feature films
American black-and-white films
Films directed by Harrish Ingraham
Films set in the 1860s
American historical drama films
1910s historical drama films
1910s English-language films
1910s American films
Silent American drama films